Magnetococcus marinus is a species of Alphaproteobacteria that has the peculiar ability to form a structure called a magnetosome, a membrane-encased, single-magnetic-domain mineral crystal formed by biomineralisation, which allows the cells to orient along the Earth’s geomagnetic field. The Magnetococcus marinus grows chemolithoautotrophically with thiosulfate and chemoorganoheterotrophically on acetate.

It is a basal group in the Alphaproteobacteria.

References

External links
Type strain of Magnetococcus marinus at BacDive -  the Bacterial Diversity Metadatabase

Alphaproteobacteria